The Janoskians (Just another name of silly kids in another nation) are a YouTube comedy group from Melbourne, Australia. The group consists of elder brother Beau Brooks, twins Luke and Jai Brooks, and friends Daniel Sahyounie and James Yammouni. Yammouni left in 2016.

The Janoskians have avid fans known as 'Janoskianators'. Their videos include performing gross out humor and pranks on non-consenting members of the public as well as each other, mockumentaries, dares and skits.

In August 2018, the Janoskians took a break from YouTube. However,
As of January 2021 they are back but currently only Beau Brooks (oldest member) is posting videos.

Group members 
All original five members were born in Melbourne. Three of them are brothers: Beau the eldest, Luke and Jai are twins, they met Daniel and James at school. Beau and Daniel finished high school but James, Luke and Jai dropped out to focus on the group.

The group consists of:
 Beau Peter Brooks, born , the oldest of the Brooks Brothers. Beau is commonly known as the front man for their music, with many professions including singing, modelling and acting.
 Luke Anthony-Mark Brooks, born , elder twin to Jai Brooks. Luke is also a singer in the group.
 Jaidon "Jai" Domenic-Matthew Brooks, born , younger twin and brother to Luke and Beau Brooks. Similarly to his brothers, he is a singer in the group.
 Daniel John-Richard Sahyounie, also known as "Skip", born , a vocalist in the band.

Former members 
 James Anthony Yammouni, born , a rapper in the group, as well as DJing for the Janoskian shows. He releases yearly megamixes on New Year and presents "The James Yammouni Show" on YouNow. He left in 2016 and continues as a solo artist.

Career

2011: Beginnings and breakthrough 
The Janoskians began their YouTube channel in July 2011. They posted their first video in September 2011 for their friends to have a laugh at, and one month later they gained 100,000 subscribers. They were featured on Ellen Dance Dares segment, after Scooter Braun tweeted Ellen DeGeneres with the Janoskians attempt.

They appeared in the music video for "Forget the World" by Australian singer Faydee on 14 August 2012, pulling off some of their typical stunts in a classroom setting. Jai Brooks also appeared in the music video of another one of Faydee's songs titled "Can't Let Go" on 9 October 2013.

2012–2013: International success 
On 31 March 2012, the group scheduled a meet and greet with their fans at Melbourne's Luna Park. The event had to be cancelled when unexpectedly large crowds turned up. Whilst in Perth, Western Australia, the group scheduled a meet and greet event at Westfield Whitford City shopping centre on 7 July 2012. The event attracted 3,000 teenagers, who met the group and obtained autographs. Many fans arrived early and camped out to ensure they had a chance to meet the members.

In 2012, the Janoskians signed a contract with Sony Music Australia. Their first single, "Set This World on Fire", co-written by Beau Brooks, was released on iTunes on 18 September 2012 on iTunes. An "unofficial" music video was released on 25 September, followed by an official music video on 8 October. The group later released five more music videos, taken from each of the members' perspectives. The Janoskians encouraged their fans to create their own videos for the song.

In late 2012, the group produced an eight-episode web show for MTV Australia titled The Janoskians: MTV Sessions. The show was posted to MTV Australia's website over an 8-week period, but is now available on Youtube to watch on "MTV International" Channel.

The Janoskians had their first charting hit in 2012 with "Set This World on Fire" peaking it at number 19 in the Australian Singles Chart, and also made it to Top 30 in New Zealand and Top 100 in the UK. The follow up single "Best Friends" reached number 30 in Australia, and also charted in New Zealand, the Netherlands and the UK.

The Janoskians had scheduled a meet and greet at the Wet Seal store in the Beverly Center in Los Angeles on 13 October 2013. The group expected only a few hundred people, but when roughly 7/8 thousand fans arrived, the event was shut down and the mall was evacuated by the police.

2014–2015: Would U Love Me, Janofest and Janoskians: Untold & Untrue 
On 22 February 2014, The Janoskians organised a meet-up in Times Square, New York. Expecting around 1,000 fans to turn up but 20,000 fans arrived, hoping to meet the group to get autographs. Police closed off 7th Avenue at 43rd Street for several hours and hustled the group into Foxwoods Theater, leaving the waiting fans disappointed.
Lionsgate announced in May 2014 that it had signed a deal with The Janoskians for launching a film featuring them called Public Disturbance, which also features Mike Tyson.

"This Fuckin Song" was released along with the music video. A clean radio-friendly version had also been launched retitled "This Freakin Song". Both were released on 29 July 2014 on Republic Records, a division of UMG Recordings.
"That's What She Said" was later released on 9 September along with the music video, by Republic Records, a division of UMG Recordings, Inc.

"Got Cake Tour" which was their second tour, It had 35 tour stops all over the UK and North America. The tour started on 29 August in Birmingham and finished on 30 October in Seattle.

On 2 March 2015, they released the EP Would U Love Me which included their four songs "Would U Love Me", "MoodSwings", "LA Girl", and "Real Girls Eat Cake". They released the 'LA Girl' music video the next day on 3 March. The "MoodSwings" music video was released on 19 March and lastly the "Would U Love Me" music video was released on 3 April.

For their JanoFest event on 21 March in Wembley Arena, London for one night only, got sold out and the band released a long single called "Rock Opera" where each member had his own separate contribution on the record. James talked about how he is still the same even though he lost weight, Luke talked about his love for photography, Daniel talked about how people assume that he's dumb, Jai talks about how everyone tells him whom to date and Beau talks about how he doesn't like to be called the nice guy.

Their single "Friend Zone" was released on 7 April 2015 along with the music video where they dressed up as zombies, and later released a public prank being zombies.

On 28 August they released their first movie Janoskians Untold & Untrue. It is currently available on Netflix. They were invited to go on the red carpet with their new movie. Beau, Luke and Jai's mum Gina Brooks and Daniel's brother surprised the boys at the event, they thought they were at home in Australia.

Jahoo Jahaa Tour which is now their third tour covered The UK, Europe, America & Australia. With 22 dates around The UK and Europe, started in Dublin on 29 August and ended in Athens on 26 September.

On 2 November their new single "Teenage Desperate" was released, and the music video later released on 12 November. On 17 December another single "All I Want 4 Christmas" was released.

2016–2017: Another Fail Tour, more music 
On 4 April 2016 a new single "Love What You Have" was released.

Their "Another Fail Tour" was around North America then headed to The UK and Europe, with the first date in San Diego on 26 August and the last date in Kraków on 28 October 2016.

"One More Time" was released as a single on 9 January 2017 along with a music video on 28 January 2017 which is shot on a camping trip with them and their friends. On 10 May 2017 they released a new single "All The Things", they then released the lyric video on 18 May on their seconds channel 'JanoVlog' and also released a homemade style music video on 22 May on their main channel.

On 9 June The Janoskians twitter account announced that James had left the group.

Their follow up single on 1 August 2017 was "Enough" and it later received a music video on 23 February on their main channel. On 29 September they released another single "Oceans" which featured Australian DJ Trifo.

2018: Public Disturbance 
On 7 March 2018 the single "Fuck Up" was accidentally released as it was originally meant to be released later in the month. On 23 March they released a line of Janoskians merchandise, including t-shirts and hoodies and a onesie. In April they released the first three episodes of the series "AW PAUL" on their YouTube channel.

On 28 August 2018, Public Disturbance was released on iTunes, along with the single "We R Us" from the movie.

Online popularity and tours 

As of 2019, the group's YouTube channel has over 2.7 million subscribers. Aside from their original and main channel, "Janoskians", they have three additional channels: "JanoVlog", "DareSundays", and "TwinTalkTime". The Janoskians also credit Twitter and Facebook for their success; Each member of the group has over a million followers on Twitter.

Their first video was uploaded in September 2011, and their early videos were initially intended to be a way to show off their pranks to personal friends, but as time went on, they became popular among the general public. In an interview, a member said their video, "Awkward Train Situations" was a part of the beginning of their, "kick-off" launch as a label.

The Janoskians offer material on social networking services and are commonly the subject of fanfiction.

The Janoskians have completed three world tours in 2013, 2014 and 2016, as well as a sold out one-off Janofest show at Wembley Arena, London in 2015. They appeared in the 28th Annual Kids Choice Awards, where they had body painted suits. On 11 and 12 May 2018, they joined HRVY on his tour.

Criticism 
The Janoskians have been criticised for their reckless, dangerous and juvenile behaviour, and pushing boundaries too far. Media commentator Prue MacSween stated that, "Their act – if you can call it that – is so juvenile, and I think really irresponsible. It's astounding the power of the internet now. It just tells you that this global audience can be viral and suddenly nobodies with very little talent can suddenly be known by the world." The group has been criticised for pulling "disgusting pranks on strangers" and for engaging in "sleazy, offensive and intimidating" behaviour around babies and women.

Dirty Pig Clothing 
They had their own clothing line known as Dirty Pig Clothing. The line came to an end in early 2017, but has since been replaced with a new range of merchandise.

Discography

EP

Singles

References

External links 

 Official website

Australian comedy troupes
Australian pop music groups
Musical groups from Melbourne
Sketch comedy troupes
Online obscenity controversies
YouTube controversies
Prank YouTubers
Australian YouTubers
Musical groups established in 2011
Comedians from Melbourne